Black lung disease, also known as coal workers' pneumoconiosis (CWP) or simply black lung, is an occupational type of pneumoconiosis caused by long-term exposure to coal dust. It is common in coal miners and others who work with coal. It is similar to both silicosis from inhaling silica dust and asbestosis from inhaling asbestos dust. Inhaled coal dust progressively builds up in the lungs and leads to inflammation, fibrosis, and in worse cases, necrosis.

Black lung disease, severe state, develops after the initial, milder form of the disease known as anthracosis (from the Greek , or  – coal, carbon). This is often asymptomatic and is found to at least some extent in all urban dwellers due to air pollution. Prolonged exposure to large amounts of coal dust can result in more serious forms of the disease, simple coal workers' pneumoconiosis and complicated coal workers' pneumoconiosis (or progressive massive fibrosis, or PMF). More commonly, workers exposed to coal dust develop industrial bronchitis, clinically defined as chronic bronchitis (i.e. productive cough for three months per year for at least two years) associated with workplace dust exposure. The incidence of industrial bronchitis varies with age, job, exposure, and smoking. In nonsmokers (who are less prone to develop bronchitis than smokers), studies of coal miners have shown a 16% to 17% incidence of industrial bronchitis.

In 2013 CWP resulted in 25,000 deaths globally—down from 29,000 deaths in 1990. In the US, a 2018 study by the National Institute of Occupational Safety and Health shows a resurgence among veteran coalminers, recording the highest rate of CWP in roughly two decades.

Pathogenesis 
Coal dust is not as fibrogenic as silica dust. Coal dust that enters the lungs can neither be destroyed nor removed by the body. The particles are engulfed by resident alveolar or interstitial macrophages and remain in the lungs, residing in the connective tissue or pulmonary lymph nodes. Coal dust provides a sufficient stimulus for the macrophage to release various products, including enzymes, cytokines, oxygen radicals, and fibroblast growth factors, which are important in the inflammation and fibrosis of CWP. Aggregations of carbon-laden macrophages can be visualized under a microscope as granular, black areas. In serious cases, the lung may grossly appear black. These aggregations can cause inflammation and fibrosis, as well as the formation of nodular lesions within the lungs. The centers of dense lesions may become necrotic due to ischemia, leading to large cavities within the lung.

Appearance 
Simple CWP is marked by the presence of 1–2 mm nodular aggregations of anthracotic macrophages, supported by a fine collagen network, within the lungs. Those 1–2 mm in diameter are known as coal macules, with larger aggregations known as coal nodules. These structures occur most frequently around the initial site of coal dust accumulation—the upper regions of the lungs around respiratory bronchioles. The coal macule is the basic pathological feature of CWP and has a surrounding area of enlargement of the airspace, known as focal emphysema. Focal emphysema extends into progressive centrilobular emphysema. Less commonly a variant of panacinar emphysema develops.

Continued exposure to coal dust following the development of simple CWP may progress to complicated CWP with progressive massive fibrosis (PMF), wherein large masses of dense fibrosis develop, usually in the upper lung zones, measuring greater than 1 cm in diameter, with accompanying decreased lung function. These cases generally require a number of years to develop. Grossly, the lung itself appears blackened. Pathologically, these consist of fibrosis with haphazardly-arranged collagen and many pigment-laden macrophages and abundant free pigment. Radiographically, CWP can appear strikingly similar to silicosis. In simple CWP, small rounded nodules (see ILO Classification) predominate, tending to first appear in the upper lung zones. The nodules may coalesce and form large opacities (>1 cm), characterizing complicated CWP, or PMF.

Diagnosis

There are three basic criteria for the diagnosis of CWP:
Chest radiography consistent with CWP
An exposure history to coal dust (typically underground coal mining) of sufficient amount and latency
Exclusion of alternative diagnoses (mimics of CWP)

Symptoms and pulmonary function testing relate to the degree of respiratory impairment but are not part of the diagnostic criteria. As noted above, the chest X-ray appearance for CWP can be virtually indistinguishable from silicosis. Chest CT, particularly high-resolution scanning (HRCT), are more sensitive than plain X-ray for detecting the small round opacities.

Treatment 
There is no cure or discovered treatments for pneumoconiosis. Some patients are given oxygen to help with their breathing and are advised to stop smoking to prevent further decline in lung function. In the most extreme cases a lung transplant could be done to help prolong the patient's life expectancy.

Prevention of pneumoconiosis 
The main way to avoid contracting coal worker's pneumoconiosis is to avoid the inhalation of coal dust. Some of the ways to prevent this disease include: not smoking, wearing ventilated masks when coming in contact with potentially dangerous airborne particles, regular pulmonary exams, and becoming educated about the risks of lung diseases in your work environment.

Epidemiology 

In 2013 CWP resulted in 25,000 deaths down from 29,000 deaths in 1990. Between 1970 and 1974, prevalence of CWP among US coal miners who had worked over 25 years was 32%; the same group saw a prevalence of 9% in 2005–2006.
In Australia, CWP was considered to be eliminated in the 1970s due to strict hazard control measures. However, there has been a resurgence of CWP in Australia, with the first new cases being detected in May 2015. From 1999 to 2016, the average years of life lost due to CWP increased from 8.1 to 12.6 years, most likely due to the increased severity and progression of CWP.

History

Black lung is actually a set of conditions and until the 1950s its dangers were not well understood.  The prevailing view was that silicosis was very serious but it was solely caused by silica and not coal dust.  The miners' union, the United Mine Workers of America, realized that rapid mechanization meant drills that produced much more dust, but under John L. Lewis they decided not to raise the black lung issue because it might impede the mechanization that was producing higher productivity and higher wages.  Union priorities were to maintain the viability of the long-fought-for welfare and retirement fund, which would be sustained by higher outputs of coal.  After the death of Lewis, the union dropped its opposition to calling black lung a disease and realized the financial advantages of a fund for its disabled members.

In the Federal Coal Mine Health and Safety Act of 1969, the US Congress set up standards to reduce dust and created the Black Lung Disability Trust.  The mining companies agreed to a clause, by which a ten-year history of mine work, coupled with X-ray or autopsy evidence of severe lung damage, guaranteed compensation. Equally important was a "rate retention" clause that allowed workers with progressive lung disease to transfer to jobs with lower exposure without loss of pay, seniority, or benefits.  Financed by a federal tax on coal, the Trust by 2009 had distributed over $44 billion in benefits to miners disabled by the disease and their widows. A miner who has spent 25 years in underground coal mines has a 5–10% risk of contracting the disease.

21st century

After the Federal Coal Mine Health and Safety Act of 1969 became law in the United States, the percentage of American miners with black lung disease decreased by about 90 percent. More recently, however, rates of the disease have been on the rise. The National Institute for Occupational Safety and Health (NIOSH) reported that close to 9 percent of miners with 25 years or more experience tested positive for black lung in 2005–2006, compared with 4 percent in the late 1990s.

New findings have shown that CWP can be a risk for surface coal miners, who are 48% of the workforce. Data from the Coal Workers' Health Surveillance Program of NIOSH, which examined chest X-rays from more than 2,000 miners in 16 US states from 2010 to 2011, showed that 2% of miners with greater than one year of surface mining experience developed CWP. 0.5% of these miners had PMF. Most of these workers had never worked in an underground mine prior to surface mining. A high proportion of the X-rays suggested that these miners had developed silicosis.

NIOSH, with support from the Mine Safety and Health Administration (MSHA), operates a Mobile Health Screening Program, which travels to mining regions around the United States. Miners who participate in the Program receive health evaluations once every five years, at no cost to themselves. Chest x-rays can detect the early signs of and changes in CWP, often before the miner is aware of any lung problems.

A 2016–17 investigation by National Public Radio found that NIOSH had under-reported cases of progressive massive fibrosis (a complication of black lung) by at least a factor of 20.  NPR identified over 2,000 cases at certain clinics in Kentucky, Virginia, West Virginia, Pennsylvania, and Ohio, compared to 99 that NIOSH reported. NIOSH confirmed in 2018 the largest cluster of PMF ever scientifically documented, despite near-elimination of the disease in the 1990s. The causes of the spike are believed to include longer working shifts, mining of thinner coal seams (which causes mining machines to put more non-coal silica dust in the air), and retirements and layoffs that have prompted more former employees to visit health clinics.

New U.S. MSHA rules took effect in August 2016 that lowered maximum allowed dust concentrations for surface and underground mines, and exposure by miners who have been found to be developing pneumoconiosis.

Research
Work to investigate the relationship between respirable dust exposure and coal worker's pneumoconiosis was carried out in Britain by the Institute of Occupational Medicine. This research was known as the Pneumoconiosis Field Research (PFR). The research underpinned the recommendations for more stringent airborne dust standards in British coalmines and the PFR was ultimately used as the basis for many national dust standards around the world.

See also 

 Black Lung Benefits Act of 1972
 Caplan syndrome

References

External links
 
 NIOSH Coal Workers' Health Surveillance Program
 Mine Safety and Health Administration
 42CFR27 Specifications of Medical Examinations of Underground Coal Miners
 Institute of Occupational Medicine's pneumoconiosis research

Lung diseases due to external agents
Occupational diseases
Coal mining